Alfredo Espino (1900—August 1928) was a poet from El Salvador. Born in Ahuachapán, his only book is Jícaras Tristes (Sad Vessels), a collection of 96 poems. It is one of the most published books of poetry in El Salvador. Espino died in San Salvador. His poetry has been described as part of the El Salvadoran development of costumbrismo.

The author is widely read and commented on in El Salvador but not usually studied or analyzed in his poetical expression. Espino assumes the national historical problem of the clash of  social strata by looking through the colors, flavors and perfumes in the land and the culture of the country at the time he wrote his poems. His book of poems has a poetic and delicate tone with lyrical vision; presented/displayed with a simple style that is easy to understand and feel, therefore, without formal complications. He wrote sonnets, romance and free verses. His work is very youthful and for that reason it may seem to lack creative vision according to some critics. The critics are wrong in such an opinion, of course, at least from the Salvadoran point of view. Espino's poetry is more descriptive and visual in it content than any other poetry of Salvadoran poets, maybe with the only exception of Salarrué. An interesting note about Espino's poetry is that he did not live to see his poetry published.

External links
Alfredo Espino at www.palabravirtual.com
Bio
CUSCATLAN at www.cuscatla.com

Salvadoran poets
Salvadoran male writers
Male poets
1900 births
1928 deaths
People from Ahuachapán
20th-century poets
20th-century male writers